was a Japanese politician, educator and economist.

He was born in Edo (after renamed to Tokyo), and grown in Karatsu, Saga. He argued the classical economics and free trade policy, and introduced John Stuart Mill's theory into Japan, from Meiji to pre-war Showa era. He was elected in the first Japanese general election in 1890, from the Rikken Kaishintō, which pursued a British-style constitutional monarchy. He was also a president of Toyo Keizai Inc. and Waseda University.

1860 births
1938 deaths
Presidents of universities and colleges in Japan